Devlin Patrick "Duck" Hodges (born April 12, 1996) is a former American football quarterback. He played college football at Samford, after playing at Mortimer Jordan High School. He was signed by the Pittsburgh Steelers as an undrafted free agent in 2019.

College career
Hodges was a four-year starter at quarterback for Samford. He was named the Southern Conference Offensive Player of the Year three times, and he was the recipient of the 2018 Walter Payton Award during his senior year in which he set the NCAA FCS career record for passing yards with 14,584. Hodges’ mark broke the previous record that was set by former Alcorn State quarterback Steve McNair in 1994.

College statistics

Professional career

Pittsburgh Steelers

2019 season
Hodges signed with the Pittsburgh Steelers as an undrafted free agent on May 13, 2019. He was waived on August 31, 2019. The Steelers re-signed Hodges to their practice squad on September 10, 2019. He was promoted to the active roster on September 16, 2019, following an injury to starter Ben Roethlisberger.

On October 6, 2019, he made his professional debut with the Steelers in a game against the Baltimore Ravens following an injury to Mason Rudolph. In his first regular season game, Hodges completed seven of nine passes for 68 yards, and ran the ball twice for 20 yards. He won his first NFL start in the October 13, 2019, game against the Los Angeles Chargers. In the game, Hodges threw for 132 yards, one touchdown, and one interception. On November 24, 2019, Hodges replaced Rudolph midway through the third quarter and threw for 118 yards which included a 79-yard touchdown pass en route to a 16–10 comeback victory over the Cincinnati Bengals. On November 26, Steelers' head coach Mike Tomlin named Hodges the starting quarterback for the Steelers' next game against the Cleveland Browns. In the game, Hodges threw for 212 yards, one touchdown, and one interception in the 20–13 win. After another win over the Arizona Cardinals, Hodges struggled against the Buffalo Bills on Sunday Night Football on December 15, 2019, throwing for 202 yards, 1 touchdown, and a career-high 4 interceptions as the Steelers lost 10–17.

In Week 16 against the New York Jets, Hodges was benched early in the second quarter for Rudolph after throwing two interceptions.  He was put back into the game in the fourth quarter after Rudolph suffered a shoulder injury. The Steelers lost 10–16. In total, Hodges threw for 84 yards and two interceptions during the loss. Hodges appeared in eight games as a rookie and totaled 1,063 passing yards, five touchdowns, and eight interceptions.

2020 season
Hodges was waived by the Steelers on September 6, 2020, and was signed to the practice squad the next day. His practice squad contract with the team expired after the season on January 18, 2021.

Los Angeles Rams
On January 25, 2021, Hodges signed a reserve/future contract with the Los Angeles Rams. He was waived on August 23, 2021.

NFL career statistics

Ottawa Redblacks 
On September 16, 2021, Hodges signed with the Ottawa Redblacks to a three-year contract. On November 5, 2021, the Redblacks announced that Hodges would be the team's starting quarterback for their November 6 game against the Toronto Argonauts. Hodges struggled in his debut, completing only eight passes on 22 attempts for 90 passing yards as the Redblacks lost to the Argos 23–20. He finished the season having played in four games, completing 16 of 38 pass attempts with one interception. He also carried the ball nine times for 38 yards. On April 22, 2022, the Redblacks announced that Hodges had retired from professional football.

Personal life
Hodges gained the nickname "Duck" at Samford for his prowess at duck calling. Hodges won the 2009 Junior World Duck Calling Contest at age 13 and won the 2018 Alabama State Duck Calling Championship. His brother, Duncan, played quarterback for the VMI Keydets.

References

External links
Ottawa Redblacks bio
Samford Bulldogs bio
CFL bio

1996 births
Living people
American football quarterbacks
Los Angeles Rams players
Ottawa Redblacks players
People from Jefferson County, Alabama
Pittsburgh Steelers players
Players of American football from Alabama
Samford Bulldogs football players
Walter Payton Award winners